The Idiot (French: L'idiot) is a 1946 French drama film directed by Georges Lampin and starring Edwige Feuillère, Lucien Coëdel and Jean Debucourt. It is an adaptation of Fyodor Dostoevsky's novel The Idiot. The film's sets were designed by Léon Barsacq, credited as the art director. It was shot at the Epinay and Neuilly Studios in Paris.

Cast
 Edwige Feuillère as Nastasia Filipovna 
 Lucien Coëdel as Rogogine  
 Jean Debucourt as Totsky  
 Sylvie (actress) as Madame Ivolguine  
 Gérard Philipe as Le prince Mychkine 
 Nathalie Nattier as Aglaé Epantchine  
 Jane Marken as Naria  
 Maurice Chambreuil as Le général Epantchine  
 Michel André as Gania Ivolguine  
 Elisabeth Hardy as Sophie Ivolguine  
 Roland Armontel as Louliane Timofeievitch Lebediev l'ivrogne  
 Mathilde Casadesus as Adélaïde Epantchine  
 Janine Viénot as Alexandra Epantchine  
 Tramel as Ivolguine 
 Marguerite Moreno as La générale Elisabeth Prokofievna Epantchine 
 Danielle Godet 
 Rodolphe Marcilly
 Maurice Régamey 
 Victor Tcherniavsky
 Charles Vissières 
 Georges Zagrebelsky

References

Bibliography 
 Dayna Oscherwitz & MaryEllen Higgins. The A to Z of French Cinema. Scarecrow Press, 2009.

External links 
 

1946 films
French historical drama films
1940s historical drama films
1940s French-language films
Films directed by Georges Lampin
Films based on The Idiot
Films set in the 19th century
Films set in Russia
Films shot at Epinay Studios
French black-and-white films
1946 drama films
1940s French films